Amina Yousry (born 9 March 2000 in Cairo) is an Egyptian professional squash player. As of February 2018, she was ranked number 64 in the world.

References

2000 births
Living people
Egyptian female squash players
Sportspeople from Cairo
21st-century Egyptian women